A presidential election was held in Guatemala on 29 December 1930.

The Congress to elect the provisional president of the Speaker of the Congress José María Reina Andrade (Liberal Party).
Assumed office 2 January 1931

References

1930-12-29
1930 elections in Central America
1930 in Guatemala